Davenport and Cale Green is an electoral ward in Stockport, England, which elects three councillors to Stockport Metropolitan Borough Council.

Davenport railway station falls outside the ward, as does Davenport Park and the site of the former Davenport Cinema. The ward is north of Bramhall North and south of Brinnington and Central.

Councillors 
The ward is represented in Parliament by Nav Mishra MP for Stockport.

The ward is represented on Stockport Metropolitan Borough Council by:

 Elise Wilson (Lab)
 Dickie Davies (Lab)
 Wendy Wild (Lab)

 indicates seat up for re-election.
 indicates seat won in by-election.
 indicates councillor defected.

Elections in 2010s

May 2019

May 2018

May 2016

May 2015

May 2014

May 2012

May 2011

References

External links
Stockport Metropolitan Borough Council

Wards of the Metropolitan Borough of Stockport